Crime as Forgiven by Against Me!, or just Crime, was the second EP released by punk band Against Me!. It was one of the first releases to achieve any level of circulation, due to their previous self-titled 12" only having sold 145 copies. The CD version contains six songs, although only four were on the vinyl edition that was released by Against Me!'s Sabot Productions. The CD version was released by Plan-It-X Records with two more songs, Impact and Burn. The CD was re-pressed by Sabot to include the bonus tracks.

In early 2005, the band requested that Plan-It-X Records halt future represses of the CD version of Crime. Since then, it hasn't been in print. The record label was under no obligation to comply because there was no recording contract or exchange of rights.

Track listing

Personnel

Against Me!
 Laura Jane Grace – guitar, vocals, artwork
 Kevin Mahon – drums, percussion, vocals

Additional musicians
 Jennifer Becker – backing vocals
 Jordan Kleeman – backing vocals, artwork

Production
 Rob McGregor – recording
 Mark Richardson – mastering

References

Against Me! EPs
Plan-It-X Records albums
2001 EPs
Folk EPs
Punk rock EPs
Albums produced by Rob McGregor